The Big Allotment Challenge is a British game show that has aired on BBC Two between 15 April 2014 and 17 February 2015. It is hosted by Fern Britton and is about gardening in Britain.

The three judges are Jim Buttress (for the "grow challenge", involving fruit and vegetables), Jonathan Moseley (for the "make challenge", involving flowers) and Thane Prince (for the "eat challenge", involving food).

Production
The series was announced on 22 August 2013 by Janice Hadlow, the BBC Two controller. The gardeners have four months in Oxfordshire to grow their fruits and vegetables.

Episode Guide

Transmissions

Series 1 (2014)
In Oxfordshire, nine pairs of gardeners competed in The Big Allotment Challenge 2014. Only one team could win and after each episode, one team left the series.

Elimination table 

 The contestant got to the next round.
 The contestant won one challenge.
 The contestant won two challenges
 The contestant was eliminated without winning any challenges
 The contestant was eliminated despite winning a challenge
 The contestant won the competition.

Series 2 (2015)
In Oxfordshire, nine gardeners competed in The Big Allotment Challenge 2015.

The winner was Rob Smith, a 35-year old from Sheffield, who works as a cabin crew member for Virgin Atlantic.

References

External links

2014 British television series debuts
2015 British television series endings
BBC Television shows
English-language television shows
Television shows set in the United Kingdom
Television series by Sony Pictures Television